Joseph H. Blacklock (20 October 1878 – 28 June 1945) was an English rugby football player.

Biography
He began his playing career with Maryport RUFC where he gained the first of his twenty-nine Cumberland county caps. He was a member of their cup winning side in 1893 and again in 1894. He came to Aspatria in 1895, after accepting a position of Deputy Foreman in the local colliery. Blacklock, a strong forward played regularly for the Aspatria club. He was a member of the Cumberland cup winning side of 1895, ’96 and ’99, captaining the side in the latter. He gained two England international caps, both against Ireland; he also represented the North, in their annual game against the South, on several occasions. In 1900, he left Aspatria for a short spell at Broughton Rangers, where he continued to play under the amateur code. He captained the Aspatria Hornets for a brief period before moving to Workington until his retirement. Joseph Blacklock died at Fletchertown, Cumberland on 28 June 1945.

Sports career

References

External links
Search for "Joseph Blacklock" at britishnewspaperarchive.co.uk
Search for "Joe Blacklock" at britishnewspaperarchive.co.uk

1878 births
1945 deaths
Broughton Rangers players
England international rugby union players
English rugby league players
English rugby union players
Rugby union players from Aspatria
Rugby league players from Tyne and Wear
Rugby union players from South Shields
Workington Town players